Barmazid-e Sofla (also Romanized as Barmazīd-e Soflá and Barmazīd Soflá; also known as Barmazīd-e Pā’īn, Mazīd, and Zīd) is a village in Qaleh Zari Rural District, Jolgeh-e Mazhan District, Khusf County, South Khorasan Province, Iran. At the 2006 census, its population was 28, in 10 families.

References 

Populated places in Khusf County